Sheffield Theatres is a theatre complex in Sheffield, South Yorkshire, England. It comprises three theatres: the Crucible, the Lyceum and the Tanya Moiseiwitsch Playhouse.  These theatres make up the largest regional theatre complex outside the London region and show a variety of in-house and touring productions.

Artistic Directors 
1981 – 1992 – Clare Venables
1992 – 1994 – Michael Rudman
1995 – 2000 – Deborah Paige
2000 – 2005 – Michael Grandage
2005 – 2007 – Samuel West
2009 – 2016 – Daniel Evans
2016 – present – Robert Hastie

Production history

2017 productions
Everybody's Talking About Jamie by Tom MacRae with music and lyrics by Dan Gillespie Sells directed by Jonathan Butterell
Musical Differences by Robin French directed by George Richmond-Scott as part of National Theatre Connections
Julius Caesar by William Shakespeare directed by Robert Hastie
Tribes by Nina Raine directed by Kate Hewitt
What We Wished For by Chris Bush with music by Claire McKenzie directed by Emily Hutchinson
Desire Under The Elms by Eugene O'Neill directed by Sam Yates
Uncle Vanya by Anton Chekhov translated by Peter Gill directed by Tamara Harvey in a co-production with Theatre Clwyd
The Wizard Of Oz by L. Frank Baum with music and lyrics by Harold Arlen and E. Y. Haburg directed by Robert Hastie

2018 productions
Chicken Soup by Ray Castleton and Kieran Knowles directed by Bryony Shanahan
Frost/Nixon by Peter Morgan directed by Kate Hewitt
The Changing Room by Chris Bush directed by Emily Hutchinson as part of National Theatre Connections
The York Realist by Peter Gill directed by Robert Hastie in a co-production with The Donmar Warehouse
Love And Information by Caryl Churchill directed by Caroline Steinbeis
One Flew Over The Cuckoo's Nest by Dale Wasserman from the novel by Ken Kesey directed by Javaad Alipoor
Songs From The Seven Hills by John Hollingworth with music and lyrics by Claire McKenzie and Scott Gilmour directed by Emily Hutchinson
Steel by Chris Bush directed by Rebecca Frecknall
A Midsummer Night's Dream by William Shakespeare with music by Dan Gillespie Sells directed by Robert Hastie 
Close Quarters by Kate Bowen directed by Kate Wasserberg in a co-production with Out Of Joint
Kiss Me, Kate by Sam Spewack and Bella Spewack with music and lyrics by Cole Porter directed by Paul Foster

2019 productions
Rutherford & Son by Githa Sowerby directed by Caroline Steinbeis
hang by debbie tucker green directed by Taio Lawson
Stuff by Tom Wells directed by Emily Hutchinson as part of National Theatre Connections
Standing At The Sky's Edge by Chris Bush with music and lyrics by Richard Hawley directed by Robert Hastie
Life Of Pi by Lolita Chakrabarti from the novel by Yann Martel directed by Max Webster
The Last King Of Scotland by Steve Waters from the novel by Giles Foden directed by Gbolahan Obisesan
Reasons To Stay Alive by April De Angelis from the novel by Matt Haig directed by Jonathan Watkins
My Mother Said I Never Should by Charlotte Keatley directed by Jeni Draper, a co-production with fingersmiths
Guys And Dolls by Jo Swerling and Abe Burrows, with music and lyrics by Frank Loesser based on a story and characters of Damon Runyon, and directed by Robert Hastie

2020 productions
Coriolanus by William Shakespeare, directed by Robert Hastie
Run Sister Run by Chloe Moss, in a co-production with Paines Plough and Soho Theatre
Here's What She Said To Me by Oladipo Agboluaje and directed Moji Elufowoju, in a co-production with Utopia Theatre Company
Oscar And The Pink Lady by Bryony Lavery from the novel by Eric-Emmanuel Schmitt
Everybody's Got To Leave Sometime in a co-production with Dante Or Die
Oliver Twist from the novel by Charles Dickens

2021-22 productions
 She Loves Me, a musical with a book by Joe Masteroff, lyrics by Sheldon Harnick, and music by Jerry Bock.
 Anna Karenina, from Helen Edmundson’s adaptation, directed by Anthony Lau.
 Rock / Paper / Scissors, a trio of interwoven original plays by Chris Bush, performed simultaneously by one cast with three creative/production teams.

Pinter: A Celebration

Sheffield Theatres' programme  Pinter: A Celebration took place from 11 October to 11 November 2006.  The programme featured selected productions of Harold Pinter's plays, in order of presentation: The Caretaker, No Man's Land, Family Voices, Tea Party, The Room, One for the Road and The Dumb Waiter. These films (mostly his screenplays; some in which Pinter appears as an actor) were shown:  The Go-Between, Accident, The Birthday Party, The French Lieutenant's Woman, Reunion, Mojo, The Servant and The Pumpkin Eater.

Pinter: A Celebration also included other related programme events: "Pause for Thought" (Penelope Wilton and Douglas Hodge in conversation with Michael Billington), "Ashes to Ashes – A Cricketing Celebration", a "Pinter Quiz Night", "The New World Order", the BBC Two documentary film Arena: Harold Pinter (introduced by Anthony Wall, producer of Arena), and "The New World Order – A Pause for Peace" (a consideration of "Pinter's pacifist writing" [both poems and prose] supported by the Sheffield Quakers), and a screening of "Pinter's passionate and antagonistic 45-minute Nobel Prize Lecture."

References

External links
 Sheffield Theatres

Culture in Sheffield
Theatres in Sheffield